Round Rock is a city in the U.S. state of Texas, in Williamson County (with a small part in Travis County), which is a part of the Greater Austin metropolitan area. Its population is 119,468 as of the 2020 census.

The city straddles  the Balcones Escarpment, a fault line in which the areas roughly east of Interstate 35 are flat and characterized by having black, fertile soils of the Blackland Prairie, and the west side of the Escarpment, which consists mostly of hilly, karst-like terrain with little topsoil and higher elevations and which is part of the Texas Hill Country.

In August 2008, Money named Round Rock as the seventh-best American small city in which to live.  Round Rock was the only Texas city to make the Top 10. In a CNN article dated July 1, 2009, Round Rock was listed as the second-fastest-growing city in the country, with a population growth of 8.2% in the preceding year.

According to the 2008 ratings from the Texas Education Agency, the Round Rock Independent School District  ranks among the best in the state. Of 42 schools within it, 12 were rated exemplary and 11 were recognized.

Round Rock is perhaps best known as the international headquarters of Dell, which employs about 16,000 people at its Round Rock facilities.  The presence of Dell along with other major employers, an economic development program, major retailers such as IKEA, a Premium Outlet Mall, and the mixed-use La Frontera center, have changed Round Rock from a sleepy bedroom community into its own self-contained "super suburb".

History

Prehistoric Round Rock

Round Rock and Williamson County have been the site of human habitation since at least 9,200 BCE. The area's earliest known inhabitants lived during the late Pleistocene (Ice Age), and are linked to the Clovis culture around 9,200 BCE based on evidence found at the much-studied Gault Site, midway between Georgetown and Fort Hood. One of the most important discoveries in recent times is the ancient skeletal remains dubbed "the Leanderthal Lady" because of its age and proximity to Leander, Texas. The site has been studied for many years and samples carbon date to this particular Pleistocene period around 10,500 years ago.

These archeology dig sites show a much greater volume United States evidence of Archaic period inhabitants based on relics and flint tools recovered from burned rock middens.
The earliest known "historical" Native American occupants, the Tonkawa, were a flint-working, hunting people who followed the buffalo on foot and periodically set fire to the prairie to aid them in their hunts.

Post-Archaic Native American History

During the 18th century, the Tonkawa made the transition to a horse culture and used firearms to a limited extent. Apparently, small numbers of Kiowa, Yojuane, Tawakoni, and Mayeye Native-Americans lived in the county at the time of the earliest Anglo settlements. After they were crowded out by white settlement, the Comanches raided settlements in the county until the 1860s. In the late 19th century, Native Americans were being pushed out of Central Texas.

As the area developed into a rural Anglo community, some of the modern paved roads followed the original Native-American pathways. One famous immigration route passed through Round Rock and is called the "Double File Trail" because the path was wide enough for two horsemen to ride side-by-side. It is part of a longer trail from North Texas that crossed the San Gabriel River in Georgetown, Brushy Creek in Round Rock, and the Colorado River in Austin. An elementary school in the Round Rock school district is named for the trail, Double File Trail Elementary School.

19th-century history

In 1851, a small community was formed on the banks of Brushy Creek, near a large round and anvil-shaped rock in the middle of the creek. This round rock marked a convenient low-water crossing for wagons, horses, and cattle. The first postmaster called the community "Brushy", and the creek was called "Brushy Creek", but in 1854, at the suggestion of the postmaster, the small settlement was renamed Round Rock in honor of this now famous rock. After the Civil War, Jesse Chisholm began moving cattle from South Texas through Round Rock on the way to Abilene, Kansas. The route he established, which crossed Brushy Creek at the round rock, became known as the Chisholm Trail. Most of the old buildings, including the old Saint Charles Hotel, have been preserved. This historic area is now called "Old Town".

Downtown Round Rock was the site of a historic gunfight and subsequent capture (and death) of the 19th-century American train robber Sam Bass, by the Texas Ranger Division on July 19, 1878. The Rangers followed Bass and his gang after they robbed the Fort Worth-to-Cleburne train. Bass was tracked to Round Rock, and as he attempted to flee, Bass was shot and killed in a gun battle by Ranger George Herold and Ranger Sergeant Richard Ware. Sheriff's Deputy A.W. Grimes was killed in the shootout. Near Ware was Soapy Smith, a noted con man, and his cousin Edwin, who witnessed Ware's shot. Soapy exclaimed, "I think you got him." The event is known locally as the "Sam Bass Shootout". This shootout is recreated each year at the July 4 Frontier Days Celebration in Old Settlers Park. Bass is buried in Round Rock Cemetery, northwest of "Old Town" on Sam Bass Road. His original headstone can be found on display at the Round Rock Public Library.

20th-century history

Cotton

In the first half of the 20th century, the county's wealth came from the cotton fields. Cotton, row crops, grapes, and truck farming were the predominant subsistence east of Interstate 35. West of the Balcones divide, ranchers raised cattle, sheep, and to a lesser extent, goats. Due to Round Rock's favorable geographic location over the rich, fertile "blackland prairie" soils also known locally as the "black waxy" (due to the soil's high clay content), cotton was the largest economic driver at that time. Because of the soil and climate, this ecoregion is ideally suited to crop agriculture. Nearby Taylor, Texas, east of Round Rock, was the primary cotton center where the crop was hauled for ginning (its seeds mechanically removed) at the cotton gin, compressed into bales, and shipped by train. Austin was also a cotton center for a time once the railroad arrived there in the 1870s. Cotton production and cattle raising, on a much smaller scale, continues today, although primarily east of Round Rock.

Chisholm Trail Crossing Park

To preserve the heritage of the famous crossing, a Chisholm Trail Crossing Park was developed to provide visitors with a simulated scene of Round Rock's historical role in the Chisholm cattle drive. Commemorative plaques in the park tell of the history of Round Rock. The bronze sculptures of four steers and pioneer woman Hattie Cluck and her son, Emmitt, were commissioned by the city through donations from Round Rock residents. The sculptures depict Round Rock's history as a crossing location along the Chisholm Trail. The project plans include 18 to 20 additional bronze statues over time.

Old Settlers Association

Following the end of the American Civil War, a group of Confederate veterans held a reunion in Georgetown on August 27, 1904, for the old settlers of Williamson County and their descendants. The invitation promised "good music, plenty to eat, and above all a warm welcome." The event was well-attended, and reunions—now called Old Settlers Association (OSA) reunions—have been held annually ever since. After the initial one, the event was moved to Round Rock and eventually a structure was built (along with three restored log cabins) in the Palm Valley area of Round Rock, in front of Old Settlers Park, just off Highway 79 in east Round Rock. All members of the organization are descendants of Williamson County residents prior to 1904. OSA has about 50 active members and 300 members in all. The Old Settlers Association today is a social and educational group, with the purpose of facilitating social activities, as well as collecting and preserving important historical information and facts. The facilities are rented for meetings, arts and craft and collectable shows, events, parties, weddings and rehearsal dinners.

The economic impact of Interstate 35

In the 1950s, planners of the new Interstate Highway System proposed to route Interstate 35 through Taylor, whose population and cotton industry made it the county's economic powerhouse. No one even knew what an "Interregional Highway" would look like, unless they had traveled to Germany to see the Autobahn or the Merritt Parkway in Connecticut. Instead, they wanted improvements to the farm-to-market roads and a straight route to Austin.

Meanwhile, Round Rock leaders sought the highway and its potential economic benefits. Mayor Louis Henna lobbied the Highway Commission. In June 1956, the 15-year debate over the form, funding, and route of the Interstate was resolved. Due to the heavy lobbying, and not wanting to antagonize Taylor, the highway was built along the edge of the Balcones Fault line, running through Round Rock. The precise route was not without opposition, however, as the new road cut off "Old Town" to the west from what had become the more recent "downtown" area east of Interstate 35. The Interstate eventually made Round Rock into a viable and vibrant commercial center, while Taylor withered with the decline of the cotton industry. Today, it is a minor, modest town with a smaller population, while Round Rock has thrived and rapidly grown into the largest city in the county, attracting  Dell Computer and major retail centers. The transformation of Round Rock is detailed in a book by Linda Scarborough (publisher of the Williamson County Sun newspaper) titled Road, River and Ol' Boy Politics: A Texas County's Path from Farm to Supersuburb published by Texas State Historical Press.

Life as a bedroom community

By the 1990s, Round Rock was primarily a bedroom community with the majority of its employed residents working in Austin and then returning home after work to places such as Round Rock and Georgetown, where housing and land were less expensive. In the 1990s, Round Rock had few major employers and jobs other than local retail and other services, or ranching and farming. In the late 1990s, though, that began to change as economic development became a major focus of the city and the Chamber of Commerce. Dell Corporation moved its headquarters to Round Rock, which has provided a significant number of jobs with 16,000 employees at its Round Rock headquarters.(See also the Business and economic development section in this article.)

Geography
According to the US Census Bureau, the city has an area of 26.3 square miles (68.0 km2), of which 26.1 square miles (67.7 km2) are land and 0.1 square mile (0.3 km2) (0.50%) is covered by water.

Climate
The climate in this area is characterized by generally hot, humid summers and mild, cool winters. According to the Köppen climate classification, Round Rock has a humid subtropical climate, Cfa on climate maps.

The city was heavily damaged by a high-end EF2 tornado on March 21, 2022. The tornado continued well northeast of the city afterwards, causing additional damage before dissipating. Sixteen people were injured.

Demographics

As of the 2020 United States census, there were 119,468 people, 41,896 households, and 29,962 families residing in the city. The 42,580 housing units had 32,338 owner-occupied homes with a median value of $172,500. Of the 41,896 households, 29.7% had children under the age of 18 living with them, 60.5% were married couples living together, 11.0% had a female householder with no husband present, and 24.4% were not families. About 18.1% of all households were made up of individuals, and 3.0% had someone living alone who was 65 years of age or older. The average household size was 2.87, and the average family size was 3.29.

In the city, the age distribution was 31.9% under 18, 8.5% from 18 to 24, 38.8% from 25 to 44, 16.3% from 45 to 64, and 4.5% who were 65 or older. The median age was 32 years. For every 100 females, there were 98.6 males.

The per capita income for the city was $30,605.

Economy

The City of Round Rock has maintained a high quality of life, while becoming a major center for economic growth in Central Texas, with industry clusters in clean energy, advanced manufacturing, life sciences, and computer/software development.

Round Rock has more than 20 major employers including: Toppan Photomasks, Sears Customer Care, IKEA, Round Rock Premium Outlets, KoMiCo Technology Inc., Texas Guaranteed Student Loan Corp, Cintas, Prudential Overall Supply, Dresser, Hospira, TECO-Westinghouse, Cerilliant Corporation, Emerson Process Management, and Dell.

Dell corporate headquarters
Dell is a multinational computer and information technology corporation based in Round Rock, which develops, sells and supports computers and related products and services. The company employs about 11,500 people in the Round Rock facilities, and as of 2017, about 138,000 people worldwide. Dell was originally based in Austin after its initial formation in 1984 as PC's Limited by UT college student Michael Dell. With the need for significant space as it expanded, the City of Round Rock in 1996 offered Dell a "Chapter 380" agreement by offering to split sales tax revenue from in-state sales 50/50 between Dell and the city. A "Chapter 380" agreement is named for the chapter in Vernon's Statutes that permits sales tax revenue sharing for economic development purposes. It was the first time such an agreement had been used in Central Texas and among the first in the state. As of 1999, approximately half of the general fund of the City of Round Rock originates from sales taxes generated from the Dell headquarters. Today the company is one of the largest technology companies in the world, listed as number 38 on the Fortune 500 (2010). Fortune also lists Dell as the #5 most admired company in its industry.
As part of its clean energy program in 2008, Dell switched the power sources of the Round Rock headquarters to more environmentally friendly ones, with 60% of the power coming from TXU Energy wind farms and 40% coming from the Austin Community Landfill gas-to-energy plant operated by Waste Management, Inc.

Commercial and retail
Round Rock's largest commercial and office business center is La Frontera, at the intersection of Loop 1, SH 45, and IH-35. La Frontera combines multitenant offices, company headquarters facilities,  of retail, and several apartment complexes and other smaller retail and housing centers. The project also includes Williamson County's largest hotel, the Austin North Marriott, which provides space for large conferences, meetings, and banquets - a first for the county and an important component of Round Rock's economic efforts. The center is also home to the Texas Guaranteed Student Loan Corporation, and Emerson Process Management. The retail portion is the second-largest outdoor commercial project in the Austin-Round Rock metro area.  La Frontera was developed by Bill Smalling and Don Martin, with Fort Worth financier Ed Bass as financial partner.

In 2006, a retail-only hub opened in Round Rock at the corner of IH-35 and Highway 1431 (now renamed "University Boulevard"): The major retailer center includes the Simon Property Group's Premium Outlets Mall, across the street is IKEA as well as numerous other retail stores and restaurants. The project was developed by Simon Property Group, with other portions by Barshop and Oles of Austin.

Sports

Round Rock is home to the Round Rock Express, a Triple-A Minor League Baseball team of the Pacific Coast League, owned by RSR Sports (Nolan Ryan, Don Sanders, Reid Ryan) and was founded by Reid Ryan, son of Baseball Hall of Famer Nolan Ryan. As of August 2010, Nolan Ryan is also the new owner of the major league Texas Rangers ball club.  Home games for the Express are played at the Dell Diamond, a facility that is owned by the City of Round Rock and leased long-term to RSR Sports, which runs and maintains the facility.

Round Rock opened a free public skate park in 2007 behind the Clay Madsen Recreation Center on Gattis School Road.

Round Rock is the self-proclaimed "Sports Capital of Texas". The city's Old Settlers Park offers a professionally designed disc golf course, cricket, cross country running, twenty-field baseball complex, five-field softball complex, and seven soccer facilities in addition to the Rockin' River Family Aquatic Center.

The 11th annual US Quidditch Cup championship quidditch tournament was hosted in Round Rock in April 2018.

Government

City government
The city of Round Rock is managed through a council-manager form of government. The city council is composed of six city council members and the mayor. The mayor and all council members are elected at large and serve the entire city, not by geographic precincts. The mayor pro tem is appointed annually by council members. City Council positions are not full-time jobs. The council appoints a full-time city manager, who manages the daily affairs of the city, and all council meetings are held at 221 E. Main Street, in downtown Round Rock, on the second and fourth Thursdays of each month at 7 pm, unless indicated otherwise. Council meetings are televised.

County government
The Commissioners Court is the overall governing and management body of Williamson County, consisting of five members. The county judge presides as chairman over the court, and is elected every four years by all voters in the county. Four commissioners are elected by single-member precincts every four years. While the majority of Round Rock is within Precinct 1, all four precincts include some portions of the city.

State and national representation

 Texas House of Representatives: State Representative District 52: James Talarico (D)
 Texas Senate District 5: Charles Schwertner (R)
 US Congress – Congressman John R. Carter (R), Congressional District 31
 US Congress – Congressman Michael McCaul (R), Congressional District 10

Other political subdivisions
Municipal utility districts, commonly referred to as "MUDs", play a significant role in Round Rock. Each is a special-purpose district that provides public utilities such as water, wastewater, storm water, and sometimes roads, parks, solid waste, and other infrastructure and services to the residents of each district. MUDs are typically formed by a residential developer as a means to install utilities and roads to a project when a city is not ready or able to provide them. The developer gets reimbursed over time from the fees levied by the MUD, and at some point the area may be annexed by the city to bring the development into the city's tax base once the basic infrastructure costs are paid off.  The MUD is represented by its own board of directors, who are voted on by the residents of the district, and it has the authority to condemn land, add additional land area, and levy fees in lieu of property taxes to maintain the utilities and other facilities.

Ten MUDs are in Round Rock: Brushy Creek, Fern Bluff, Highlands at Mayfield Ranch, Meadows at Chandler Creek, Paloma Lake, Parkside at Mayfield Ranch, Siena, Teravista, Vista Oaks, and Walsh Ranch. Total population living within these MUDs is 47,648 (2010 city estimate).

Round Rock's largest district is Brushy Creek Municipal Utility District. The district name was changed to Brushy Creek Municipal Utility District in August 1990. The MUD provides a wide range of city-like services including parks and recreation, full utilities, road maintenance and a Home Owner's Association. Services a MUD can offer, however are also limited by law (for example they cannot offer library services).

Another similar but somewhat smaller MUD in Round Rock's is Fern Bluff Municipal Utility District in the Wyoming Springs area of town. Both MUDs play a significant role in local governance and maintenance of basic utilities.

From time to time, elections to the boards were contentious and heated debates arose regarding other MUD issues. Round Rock does not often annex a MUD  to avoiding having to take on the aging infrastructure replacement and upkeep costs.

Education

Public education

Round Rock Independent School District, a Texas Education Agency recognized school district, is in southern Williamson County and northwest Travis County, and includes all the City of Round Rock and portions of the cities of Austin and Cedar Park.
The area covers  encompassing high-tech manufacturing and urban retail centers, suburban neighborhoods, and farm and ranch land. Roughly 45,00 students attend the district's five high schools, ten middle schools, 32 elementary schools, and two alternative learning centers. 

In August 2010, the district opened its fifth high school (Cedar Ridge High School), a ninth-grade center reverted to a middle school, and the district's 31st elementary school opened in the Stone Oak subdivision. "The average student-teacher ratio for the district is 16. The annual dropout rate for students in grades 7–12 is 1.1%, and more than 77% of the district's graduating seniors take the SAT and ACT college entrance exams, scoring well above state and national averages." The property tax rates are significantly higher than the national average, and the schools' performance reflects the tax dollars invested.

Students: 44,781 (as of fall 2010)
Languages spoken: 77
Average SAT score: 1628 (the state average is 1462 and the national average is 1509)
Average ACT score: 24.1 (the state average is 20.8 and the national average is 21.0)
In the annual report released July 30, 2010, the Round Rock Independent School District received the highest possible rating ("Exemplary") for 25 of its schools, the highest number so rated in any of the suburban districts in Central Texas. These schools are: Westwood High School. Canyon Vista, Walsh, and Cedar Valley middle schools. Spicewood, Forest North, Caraway, Brushy Creek, Laurel Mountain, Fern Bluff, Canyon Creek, Great Oaks, Teravista, Cactus Ranch, Sommer, Deep Wood, Robertson, Pond Springs, Live Oak, Old Town, Jollyville, Forest Creek, Blackland Prairie, Union Hill and Gattis elementary schools. In 2010, the school district as a whole was rated "academically recognized", a significant step above 2009 when the school district was rated "academically acceptable" by the Texas Education Agency.

Higher education

Round Rock also has a number of higher education opportunities. In 1990, the city, under the leadership of then-City Manager Bob Bennett, planning director Joe Vining, and local citizen Mike Swayze envisioned and oversaw creation of the Texas State University Round Rock Campus (or Round Rock Higher Education Center). The concept was envisioned as a way to lure colleges and universities to jointly provide education, training, and degree opportunities on  part-time and full-time bases. The center used various empty facilities around town, and many of the initial training programs were targeted to help educate students for work at local companies, such as Dell, which had specialized needs. In 2008, an educational campus and the first RRC building—the Avery Building—was opened through the combined efforts of Texas State University, Austin Community College, and Temple College in order to provide a broader range of educational opportunities, specialized training, and varying degree programs including post graduate degrees. The campus is in the heart of the emerging Avery Center development which houses Seton Williamson, the A&M Health Science Center and other medical campuses. By the end of 2009 1,700 students were enrolled in the programs. Construction on the second Texas State campus building is underway and construction is nearly complete on this additional classroom building. (See also Texas State University Round Rock Campus)

The city is also home to the Texas A&M Health Science Center Round Rock, which opened its doors in December 2010. The campus is designed to eventually accommodate as many as 17 additional buildings over time as money is appropriated each biennium by the Texas Legislature.

In August 2010, Austin Community College's largest campus to date opened adjacent to the Texas State University center. All three campuses are adjacent to each other within the burgeoning Avery Farms development.

The newest component of higher education is the School of Nursing at Texas State University, housed within the university's College of Health Professions. Other programs offered by the college are health information management, health services research, and physical therapy.

Infrastructure

Transportation

Major highways
 Interstate 35
 U.S. Highway 79 (the southern terminus is here)
 State Highway 45
 State Highway 45 Toll Rd
 State Highway 130 Toll Rd

Toll roads

In November 2006, the Central Texas Regional Mobility Authority (CTRMA) opened the first segment of the region's first toll road system. Both State Highway 130 and State Highway 45 toll roads run through portions of Round Rock and provide greatly increased mobility to the city, albeit with strong regional opposition to the high-toll charges to motorists. State Highway 130 runs just south of Austin Bergstrom International Airport at US Highway 183 and connecting to Interstate 35 north of Georgetown, and passes through the easternmost portion of Round Rock. It provides Round Rock residents with quick access to the Austin airport for about $6 each way.

State Highway 45 is part of an eventual loop that runs east from State Highway 183 in Cedar Park to 130 at Pflugerville (east of Round Rock) where it merges with the SH 130 toll road, and then intersects with the southern portion of SH 45 near Buda, south of Austin. SH 45 passes through the entire southern portion of Round Rock. Highway 45 provides much faster access between Round Rock and Austin, alleviating what was previously a major bottleneck at Interstate 35. The project includes a tolled extension to Loop 1 (also known locally as the "Mopac Expressway") and allows direct access from to I-35 to Loop 1 by use of flyover connections rather than ground level intersections. The toll roads also provide access to the Dell headquarters and its considerable number of employees. Together, both toll roads significantly improve mobility in Round Rock.

Health care

Round Rock has a wide array of hospitals and extensive health care services. Many of these facilities serve not only Round Rock, but the greater Williamson county area, as well as North Austin.

 Saint David's Round Rock Medical Center was the first major hospital in Round Rock, opening its doors as Round Rock Hospital in 1984. It is a for-profit hospital with a Level II Trauma center as part of the extensive St. David's system.
 Scott & White Healthcare in Temple opened a satellite hospital in Round Rock in 2007. It is on University Boulevard. The facility has full hospital services, but also transfers some patients to its primary Temple campus. Scott & White is a non-profit collaborative health care system based in Temple. Scott & White Healthcare - Round Rock serves residents of Williamson and North Travis counties, including the Austin/Round Rock metropolitan area. Facilities include Scott & White Hospital; Round Rock, Scott & White Hospital; Taylor and 15 additional primary care and specialty clinic locations in: Burnet, Cedar Park, Georgetown, Hutto, Leander, Pflugerville, Round Rock and Taylor.

 Ascension Seton Williamson, formerly Seton Medical Center Williamson, is the newest hospital in Round Rock, opening in 2009 on University Boulevard. A level II trauma center, it is next to the Texas State University campus, the new Austin Community College (ACC) campus that opened in fall 2010, and the Round Rock campus of the Texas A&M Health Science Center. The facility is building out its planned expansion space ahead of schedule. It is part of the Seton Healthcare Family that is affiliated with the Daughters of Charity of Saint Vincent de Paul and Ascension Health.
 Another entrant into the health-care field in Round Rock, opened in December 2009, is the Texas A&M Health Science Center. The  building is the first of up to seventeen buildings expected to be built in coming years. The facility also houses administrative offices, classrooms and a  Lone Star Circle of Care clinic, where health care students will train.
 In 2010, the latest component of higher education is the School of Nursing at Texas State University, housed within the university's College of Health Professions. Other programs offered by the college are health information management, health services research, and physical therapy.
 Lone Star Circle of Care (LSCC) is a grant-funded organization dedicated to serving the health needs of the uninsured and underinsured in Williamson County and nearby areas. They have grown from one clinic in Georgetown in January 2001 to today having eighteen community clinics serving Central Texas. They provided 130,000 patient visits for medically underserved adults and children in 2009. Grants come from the Scott & White Foundation, Seton Foundation, the Michael & Susan Dell Foundation, Georgetown Health Foundation, St. David's Foundation, and many others. In May 2010 the Seton family of hospitals awarded LSCC a $3 million grant for pediatric care. And the new A&M Health Science Center is partnering with the Lone Star Circle of Care for a 32,000 square-foot clinical hub which opened in A&M's existing building in December 2009.

Notable people

 
 Barbette, female impersonator
Juanita Craft, politician and civil rights activist
 Ryan Goins, professional baseball player
 Larry Gonzales, Republican former member of the Texas House of Representatives from Round Rock
 Colleen LaRose, alleged terrorist
 Donnie Little, football player
 Soapy Smith, confidence man and gangster
Billie Lee Turner, botanist
Wande, a rapper and A&R administrator

Films and television programs in and about Round Rock

In "End of an Outlaw", an episode of the CBS television series Trackdown, starring Robert Culp as Texas Ranger Hoby Gilman, which aired on November 27, 1957, the Rangers halt a bank robbery planned by Sam Bass prior to the outlaw's fateful end on his 27th birthday in Round Rock.
The 1974 horror movie cult classic The Texas Chain Saw Massacre was filmed at various Central Texas locations with a majority of shooting at two houses across the road from each other on an old stretch of County Road 172 later diverted in the middle 1980s on what is known as Quick Hill—now the site of the La Frontera commercial development in Round Rock. Contrary to the movie's introduction, the movie is not based on a true story. Tours of local sites are still conducted by avid film buffs. In the early 1980s, the movie's dilapidated two-story house – abandoned long before the movie's filming and across the road from the movie's main Texas Chainsaw House built in 1910 and occupied before and after filming – was torched by local area high school students leaving a charred limestone skeleton of the mostly wooden frame. In 1998, the Texas Chainsaw House was disassembled and moved to Kingsland, Texas, where it was reassembled and fully restored and operates as a restaurant at The Antlers Hotel.
Directed by Joel and Ethan Coen, Blood Simple is a 1984 American neo-noir crime film. It was the directorial debut of the Coen brothers, and the first major film of cinematographer Barry Sonnenfeld. The film's title derives from the Dashiell Hammett novel Red Harvest, in which "blood simple" is a term coined to describe the addled, fearful mindset people are in after a prolonged immersion in violent situations. Blood Simple was re-released theatrically in 2000 and on DVD in 2001 in a "director's cut".
A majority of the 2002 Disney film The Rookie, starring Dennis Quaid and Rachel Griffiths, was shot at and around the minor-league baseball stadium in Round Rock known as Dell Diamond. It is inspired by the true story of Jim Morris who had a brief but famous Major League Baseball career.
The Simple Life: (TV Season 2, episode 15). The Simple Life is a reality television series that was broadcast from December 2, 2003, to August 5, 2007. The first three seasons aired on Fox, and the final two on E!. The comedic show depicts two wealthy young socialites (Paris Hilton and Nicole Richie) as they struggle to do manual, low-paying jobs such as cleaning rooms, doing farm work, serving meals in fast-food restaurants and working as camp counselors. Season 2, Episode 15 took place during a Round Rock Express baseball game.
Written and co-produced by Elgin native Jake Helgren, the movie A Dogwalker's Christmas Tale (2015) had many scenes shot in and around Round Rock. These included downtown Round Rock around the public library and at Star Coffee Company, the Round Rock Dog Depot, and some sidewalk scenes in Mayfield Ranch subdivision.

Sister cities
City of Lake Macquarie, became a sister city in 1985. 
Sabinas Hidalgo, Nuevo León, became a sister city in 1991.

See also

Handbook of Texas
Round Rock Public Library

Notes

References

External links

 City of Round Rock, TX
 Community Center of City of Round Rock, TX
 Round Rock Chamber of Commerce

 
1851 establishments in Texas
Cities in Greater Austin
Cities in Texas
Cities in Travis County, Texas
Cities in Williamson County, Texas
Populated places established in 1851